KLGR-FM 97.7 FM is a radio station licensed to Redwood Falls, Minnesota.  The station broadcasts a variety hits format and is owned by Digity, LLC, through licensee Digity 3E License, LLC.

History
In November 2017, KLGR-FM rebranded as "97.7 Jack FM".

Previous logo

References

External links
KLGR-FM's website

Adult hits radio stations in the United States
Radio stations in Minnesota